GanttProject is GPL-licensed (free software) Java based, project management software that runs under the Microsoft Windows, Linux and Apple macOS operating systems. This project was initiated in January 2003, at University of Marne-la-Vallée (France) and managed, at first, by Alexandre Thomas, now replaced by Dmitry Barashev.

Features
Comparing to other full-fledged project management software, one could say that GanttProject is designed considering the KISS principle.

It features most basic project management functions like a Gantt chart for project scheduling of tasks, and doing resource management using resource load charts. It can only handle days not hours. It does not have features like cash flow, message, document control, and resource leveling. It has a number of reporting options (Microsoft Project, HTML, PDF, spreadsheets).

The major features include:

 Create Work Breakdown Structure
 Task Hierarchy and Dependencies
 Gantt Chart
 Resource Load Chart
 Baselines saving and comparing
 Generation of PERT Chart
 PDF and HTML Reports
 Microsoft Project import/export with file format MPX (*.mpx) and MSPDI (*.xml) (XML-based data interchange format since Project 2002)
 Exchange data with spreadsheet applications via CSV and Excel formats
 WebDAV based groupwork
 Project file format is XML
 Vacation and Holidays management
 Available in more than 20 languages

Reception
 A number of mostly positive reviews on Capterra
 Number of download: as of January 2014, there are 1,600,000 downloads of GanttProject 2.0.10 for Microsoft Windows from Google Code. Average daily download count is about 1,500.
 InfoWorld reviewed GanttProject favorably.
 As of June 2011, the number of weekly downloads of GanttProject (version 2.0.9) at SourceForge was third among such programs: first was OpenProj (version 1.4), second was JFreeChart.  Note: Since GanttProject ver. 2.0.10 is no longer posted at SourceForge, this download ranking is not relevant.
 User rating at CNET/Download is 3.5 stars (Microsoft Project is 4.0 stars).

Gallery

See also
List of project management software
Project management software
Project management
Project planning
Project Portfolio Management
Resource Management

References

External links 
 GanttProject Official Website 
 Project home page at GitHub hosted from ver. 2.7.1
 Project home page at Google Code hosted from ver. 2.0.10
 Source Forge Entry hosted through ver. 2.0.9
 GanttProjectAPI

Free project management software
Business software for Linux